Sharon Springs Historic District is a national historic district located at Sharon Springs in Schoharie County, New York.  The district includes 167 contributing buildings and nine contributing structures.  It encompasses all of what remains of the historic mineral water spa, including commercial, institutional, and residential properties associated with its resort function during the period, ca. 1825–1941.  The focus of the district is a group of mineral springs that together constitute the world-famous spa for which the village was named. Notable buildings include the Magnesia Temple (1863), Chalybeate Temple (1920s), Lower Bath House (ca. 1876), Inhalation Bath House (ca. 1884), Imperial Bath House (1927), Adler Hotel (1928), and Roseboro Hotel (ca. 1905). Also located in the district is the separately listed American Hotel.

It was added to the National Register of Historic Places in 1994.

Gallery

See also
National Register of Historic Places listings in Schoharie County, New York

References

External links

Historic districts on the National Register of Historic Places in New York (state)
Queen Anne architecture in New York (state)
Italianate architecture in New York (state)
Historic districts in Schoharie County, New York
National Register of Historic Places in Schoharie County, New York